The Technological University (Banmaw)(also spell Bhamo) was initially constructed as Technological College (Banmaw) in December, 2001. The main building was opened on February 11, 2002. The new two- storey building was started to build on January 1, 2002 by Shwe Than Lwin Company and opened on July 10, 2005. Technological College (Banmaw) was upgraded to Technological University (Banmaw) on January 20, 2007.

Departments
 Civil Engineering Department
 Electronic and Communication Engineering Department
 Electrical Power Engineering Department
 Mechanical Engineering Department
 Academic Department

See also 
Technological University, Myitkyina

Technological University (Kalay)

List of Technological Universities in Myanmar

External links

Technological universities in Myanmar